The Colonial Museum of Bogotá (Museo Colonial de Bogotá) was inaugurated on August 6, 1942 under President of the Republic Eduardo Santos Montejo and his Minister of Education Germán Arciniegas. Its headquarters is the Casa de las Aulas, a 17th-century building that was the headquarters of the High School of the Society of Jesus, today the Xaverian University and Colegio Mayor de San Bartolomé, in Bogotá.

Collections
The pieces initially exhibited in the Colonial Museum came mostly from private collections owned by Bogota's high society in the end of the 19th century. These collections had been formed due to the process of confiscation of ecclesiastical property initiated by Tomás Cipriano de Mosquera around 1861. The paintings expropriated from the Church passed into the hands of private individuals and some of these in turn were given to different museums as a donation.

These initial collections have been gradually supplemented with new works received by donation or acquired. The museum currently has 1,577 pieces, including easel paintings, textiles, sculpture, furniture, silverware, numismatics, prints, and manuscripts.

The museum houses the largest existing collection of works by the New Granadan colonial painter, Gregorio Vásquez de Arce y Ceballos, including easel paintings and a complete series of drawings attributed to him.

Gallery

History

The Colonial Museum is located in the Claustro de las Aulas, built at the beginning of the 17th century based on the design of Juan Bautista Coluccini, S.J. The building was initially the seat of the High School of the Society of Jesus and from the first half of the 18th century of the Pontifical Xaverian University. After the expulsion of the Society of Jesus in 1767, the Cloister had multiple uses. Here the Congress of the Republic met in its early years, it was the Military Barracks, headquarters of the Colombian National Museum, the National Library and, finally, headquarters of the Museum of Colonial Art since August 6, 1942, the date on which it was inaugurated. under the presidency of Eduardo Santos Montejo, being Minister of Education Germán Arciniegas.

Some of the historical facts related to the building that houses the Colonial Museum denote the value of the "Casa de las Aulas" as a center of national life. Other events that occurred there include: The inauguration of Antonio Nariño as president before the city council in 1812, having served as a prison for Francisco de Paula Santander after the conspiracy against Bolívar in 1828, having hosted the installation of the Congreso Admirable in 1830 presided over by Simón Bolívar and finally having served as the premiere place for the Colombian national anthem, performed for the first time in the so-called “Capilla de Indios” on December 6, 1887.

This is the timeline of its history:

1604 On September 27, the Jesuit College opens. Fr. Dadey makes the presentation in front of the Audiencia de los Cabildos and the most notable of the Santafereña society.

1605 On October 18, the act of erection and foundation of the Seminary College is signed. It begins to function in what is now the Palacio de San Carlos.

1620 On September 5, a Royal Certificate authorizes the Jesuits to grant degrees.

1622 The Xaverian Academy is founded.

1634 The Government of New Granada recognizes the Xaverian Academy.

1702 On May 27, news arrives of an exaltation from the Academy to Xaverian University.

1761 On Saturday, December 25, an image of Our Lady of Light is placed in paint with a silver frame, donated by the Viceroy Don José Solís Folch de Cardona.

1767 On September 23 the Jesuits are expelled. The notary public José Roxas, the judges Verástegui and Moreno y Escandón compiled the inventories of the expropriated goods.

1812 On October 23 at eight in the morning, Don Antonio Nariño takes office as Dictator President before the Cabildo.

1813 On January 9, General Francisco de Paula Santander falls prisoner in the battle of San Victorino and is confined in the Casa de las Aulas.

1823 On December 25, the Casa de las Aulas is destined for the National Public Library.

1824 On July 4, the Natural History Museum opens to the public, inaugurated by the Vice President, General Francisco de Paula Santander. Likewise, classes begin at the School of Natural Sciences.

1828 General Francisco de Paula Santander former vice president is held as a prisoner after the conspiracy against Bolívar.

1830 On January 20, the Congreso Admirable is installed, with the words of the Liberator Simón Bolívar, electing Antonio José de Sucre, Grand Marshal of Ayacucho, as President and José María Estévez, Bishop of Santa Marta, as Vice President.

1830 On April 29, the Congreso Admirable issues the constitutional charter.

1831 On September 25, the National Convention meets in the Capilla Castrense.

1832 José María Obando ordered that the Public Library be transferred to the University.

1842 The Chapel becomes the Hall of University Degrees, Justice Hearings and other public acts, without ceasing to be the seat of the National Assembly.

1851 The Library suffers damage as a result of the Revolution.

1854 On April 17 and until June 21, 1885, the Casa de las Aulas is converted into the General Headquarters.

1856 Don José Jerónimo Triana delivers his Herbarium to the Museum of Natural History. The Library logo appears.

1871 The Museum is evicted and its elements are piled up in the halls of the Library, which has suffered deterioration due to the excavations carried out in search of treasures.

1887 On December 6, the Colombian national anthem is released.

1942 On August 6 the Museum of Colonial Art is inaugurated.

Present
During the first decade of the 21st century, the Colonial Museum entered a process of transformation that seeks to communicate to the visiting public the cultural processes that took place between the 16th and 18th centuries. In this context, there has been a museological renewal that encompasses both its administrative organization and new curatorial and museographic approaches, which make visible the memory of the colonial in Colombia. For almost 3 years, the Museum was closed to the public in preparation for the structural renovation of the Claustro de las Aulas. On August 3, 2017, it reopened its doors with a new curatorial and museographic script.

See also
List of buildings in Bogotá
List of museums in Colombia

References

External links
Colonial Art Museum of Bogotá within Google Arts & Culture

Art museums and galleries in Colombia
Museums in Bogotá
17th-century religious buildings and structures